César Leonardo Tovar (July 3, 1940 – July 14, 1994), nicknamed "Pepito" and "Mr. Versatility", was a Venezuelan professional baseball player, who played in Major League Baseball (MLB) for the Minnesota Twins (–), Philadelphia Phillies, Texas Rangers (–), Oakland Athletics (–), and New York Yankees. Tovar was an extremely versatile player capable of playing various defensive positions on the field. In 1968, he became only the second player in MLB history to play all nine field positions during a single game, a feat first accomplished by Bert Campaneris, in 1965. Tovar also had a prolific career in the Venezuelan Professional Baseball League (VPBL), where he played 26 seasons – second only to the 30 seasons played by Vic Davalillo.

Baseball playing career

Minor leagues
Tovar was born and raised in Caracas, Venezuela, where as a child, he shined shoes to earn extra income for his family. At the age of 15, he befriended Gus Gil, another Venezuelan who went on to play in Major League Baseball. In January 1959, Cincinnati Reds General Manager, Gabe Paul, attempted to sign Gil to a contract however, Gil insisted that Paul should also have Tovar sign a contract. Paul relented in order to make Gil agree to sign.

Tovar began his professional baseball career when he was assigned to the Geneva Redlegs in the D-league New York–Penn League. He hit .252 in 87 games as an infielder for Geneva in 1959. That winter, he returned to Venezuela to play for the Leones del Caracas, and won the league's rookie of the year award.

In 1960, he played with the Missoula Timberjacks of the Pioneer League where he produced a promising .304 batting average along with 12 home runs and 68 runs batted in. After being selected to the league's All-Star team, he was rewarded by getting to play two games at the top level of the Reds' minor league system with the Seattle Rainiers. Tovar was sent back to Geneva in 1961, where he batted .338 with 19 home runs and 78 runs batted in. He stole 88 bases in 100 attempts to lead the league while setting a new league record for stolen bases. In 1962, he played for the Rocky Mount Leafs of the Carolina League, and led the league in batting with a .329 batting average along with 10 home runs and 78 runs batted in.

The Reds had a promising second baseman in Pete Rose, who would win the 1963 National League Rookie of the Year Award, with future Gold Glover Cookie Rojas on the bench and second basemen Bobby Klaus and Gus Gil in their minor league system, there was little room left for Tovar to progress. The Reds sent him on loan to play for the Minnesota Twins minor league affiliate, the Dallas-Fort Worth Rangers. In 1964, Tovar returned to the Reds organization, where he played for the San Diego Padres of the Pacific Coast League. He helped the Padres win the league championship by hitting for a .275 average with 7 home runs and 52 runs batted in, while playing as a third baseman, shortstop, second baseman, and as an outfielder.

Major Leagues
Before the start of the 1965 season, the Twins traded pitcher Gerry Arrigo to the Reds for Tovar. The Twins had originally sought to get Tommy Helms from the Reds, but they refused to trade him and the Twins settled for Tovar. At the age of 24, Tovar made his major league debut on April 12, 1965, becoming the ninth Venezuelan to play in Major League Baseball. However, he would soon be sent back to the minor leagues with the Denver Bears, where he hit for a .328 average. Tovar received a September call-up and played in a total of 18 games in the season however, he would be left off the postseason roster and would watch the Twins' seven-game World Series loss to the Los Angeles Dodgers from home.

Starting in 1966, the Twins began to make ample use of Tovar's ability to play a variety of defensive positions. The 1967 season was memorable for the tight four-way pennant race between the Twins, the Boston Red Sox, the Detroit Tigers, and the Chicago White Sox, with all four teams still in contention entering the final week of the season. The Twins were in first place with two games left in the season, but lost their final two games to the Red Sox and finished the season in second place. 

Tovar played an integral role as a utility player during the Twins' 1967 pennant run, dividing his playing time between third base (70 games), center field (64), second baseman (36), left field (10), shortstop (9) and right field (5). He set an American League record of 164 games played (the Twins had two tie games in the 1967 season) and led the league with 726 plate appearances and 649 at-bats. He was also among the top 10 batters in runs, hits, doubles, triples, stolen bases, hit by pitch and sacrifice hits. At the end of the 1967 season, the Triple Crown winner, Carl Yastrzemski, received all but one vote for the American League Most Valuable Player Award; the lone dissenting ballot (cast by Minneapolis Star sports writer Max Nichols) was marked in favor of Tovar, who would finish 7th in the MVP voting.

On September 22, 1968, Tovar became the second player after Bert Campaneris (Kansas City Athletics, 1965) to play all nine fielding positions in a game. The two were later joined by Scott Sheldon (Texas Rangers, 2000), Shane Halter (Detroit Tigers, 2000), and Andrew Romine (Detroit Tigers, 2017) as the only five players in MLB history to have accomplished the feat. Tovar started the game on the mound against Oakland and pitched one scoreless inning in which he struck out Reggie Jackson. As fate would have it, the first batter he faced was Campaneris.

On May 18, 1969, Tovar combined with Rod Carew to set a major league record for most steals by a club in one inning with five. In the third inning against a Detroit battery of Mickey Lolich and Bill Freehan, Tovar stole third base and home. Carew followed by stealing second base, third base and home. The two steals of home in the same inning also tied a record. In 1970, Tovar ended the season with a .300 batting average and an AL-leading 36 doubles and 13 triples. He also ranked third in the league in total hits with 195, and second in runs scored with 120. The Twins won the American League Western Division title in both 1969 and 1970, but each time were swept in three games by the Baltimore Orioles during the play-offs. Tovar hit for only a .077 batting average in the 1969 American League Championship Series, but improved with a .385 average in the 1970 American League Championship Series.

As he improved at the plate, Tovar also moved less around the diamond – playing primarily center field in 1970, left field in 1971, and right field in 1972. He improved his hitting through 1971, when he hit for a .311 batting average and led the league with 204 hits. In 1971, SPORT magazine polled major league players to identify the game's most competitive player. Pete Rose won; the runners-up were Frank Robinson, Bob Gibson, and César Tovar. On September 19, 1972, Tovar belted a walk-off home run to hit for the cycle. Only four other players in major league baseball history have completed a cycle with a game-ending homer: Ken Boyer (1961), George Brett (1979), Dwight Evans (1984) and Carlos González (2010).

After a subpar season in 1972, the Twins traded Tovar to the Philadelphia Phillies for Ken Sanders, Ken Reynolds and Joe Lis on December 1. Tovar would then spend the 1973 season platooning with a young Mike Schmidt at third base. After being purchased by the Texas Rangers in December 1973, Tovar had a brief resurgence in 1974 as the leadoff hitter for Billy Martin, his Twins manager in 1969, hitting .292 with a .354 on-base percentage. In August 1975, the Rangers sold Tovar's contract to the Oakland Athletics who were in first place in the American League Western Division. The Athletics won the division title and Tovar appeared in two games of the 1975 American League Championship Series, getting one hit in two at-bats and scoring two runs. He was a pinch hitter and defensive replacement for the Athletics in 1976, before breaking his wrist while making a diving catch on May 31. He was activated in mid-August, only after a complaint from the Major League Baseball Players Association. The Athletics' temperamental owner, Charlie Finley, then released Tovar on August 25. The New York Yankees purchased his contract on September 1, 1976, and he appeared in 13 games for them before playing in his final major league game on September 29, 1976, at the age of 35. The Yankees released him in December 1976.

Career statistics
In his 12-year major league career, Tovar played in 1,448 games with 1,546 hits in 5,569 at bats for a .278 batting average along with 46 home runs, 435 RBI, 834 runs, 253 doubles, 55 triples, 226 stolen bases and a .335 on-base percentage.

Along with former Reds center fielder Eddie Milner, Tovar is regarded as the major league's all-time leader in breaking up no-hit attempts with five. On April 30, 1967, Tovar's single was the only hit against the Washington Senators' Barry Moore. On May 15, 1969, he broke up the no-hit bid of Baltimore pitcher, Dave McNally. Later that same season on August 10, 1969, Mike Cuellar of the Baltimore Orioles extended his streak of consecutive batters retired to 35 before surrendering a ninth-inning single to Tovar, which also broke up Cuellar's bid for a no-hitter. Tovar was responsible for spoiling two other no-hitters during his career: against the Washington's Dick Bosman (August 13, 1970) and the Yankees' Jim "Catfish" Hunter (May 31, 1975).

Later life
After retiring from the major leagues, Tovar played in the Mexican League in 1977 and 1978. In 1979, Tovar played in the short-lived Inter-American League for the Caracas Metropolitanos and hit .285 for manager Jim Busby. He also continued to play in the Venezuelan Winter League. He was a player-coach for the Águilas del Zulia team that won the 1984 league championship before going on to win the 1984 Caribbean Series. He retired as a player at the age of 45 after two final games in the winter of 1985–86. In August 1990, he managed the Venezuelan team to a 1–7 last place finish in the Baseball World Cup, which was held in Edmonton, Alberta, Canada.

Tovar died on July 14, 1994, of pancreatic cancer in Caracas, at the age of 54. He was inducted into the Venezuelan Baseball Hall of Fame in 2003.

Related links
 List of Major League Baseball annual doubles leaders
 List of Major League Baseball annual triples leaders
 List of Major League Baseball career stolen bases leaders
 List of Major League Baseball players to hit for the cycle
 List of Major League Baseball players from Venezuela

References

Further reading

External links

César Tovar at SABR (Baseball BioProject)
César Tovar at Baseball Almanac
César Tovar at Pura Pelota (Venezuelan Professional Baseball League)
César Tovar at ESPN Deportes: Latino Baseball Hall of Fame (inducted 2014)
César Tovar at Deadball Era

1940 births
1994 deaths
Águilas del Zulia players
Angeles de Puebla players
Caracas Metropolitanos players
Dallas Rangers players
Deaths from pancreatic cancer
Deaths from cancer in Venezuela
Denver Bears players
Geneva Redlegs players
Leones del Caracas players
Llaneros de Portuguesa players
Major League Baseball outfielders
Major League Baseball second basemen
Major League Baseball shortstops
Major League Baseball third basemen
Major League Baseball players from Venezuela
Minnesota Twins players
Missoula Timberjacks players
New York Yankees players
Oakland Athletics players
Philadelphia Phillies players
Plataneros de Tabasco players
Rocky Mount Leafs players
San Diego Padres (minor league) players
Seattle Rainiers players
Baseball players from Caracas
Texas Rangers players
Tigres de Aragua players
Venezuelan expatriate baseball players in Mexico
Venezuelan expatriate baseball players in the United States